Adamo is both a masculine given name and a surname. Notable people with the name include:

Given name 
 Adamo Abate (c. 990 – 1060–1070), Italian medieval Benedictine abbot and saint, a promoter of the unification of the Southern populations in Italy under Roger II of Sicily
 Adamo Boari (1863–1928), Italian civil engineer and architect
 Adamo Bozzani (1891-1969), Italian gymnast
 Adamo Pedro Bronzoni (born 1985), Italian-Peruvian film and video editor and producer
 Adamo Chiusole (1728-1787), Italian count, painter and art historian
 Adamo Coulibaly (born 1981), French footballer of Ivorian origin
 Adamo Paolo Cultraro (born 1973), Italian-American filmmaker, director, writer and producer
 Adamo Didur (1874–1946), Polish operatic bass singer
 Adamo Gentile (1615–1662), Roman Catholic prelate who served as Bishop of Lipari
 Adamo Nagalo (born 2002), Ghanaian footballer
 Adamo Rossi (1821–1891), Italian clergyman, revolutionary patriot, scholar and librarian
 Adamo Ruggiero (born 1986), Canadian actor
 Adamo Scultori (1530–1585), also referred to as Adamo Ghisi, Italian engraver, sculptor and artist
 Adamo Tadolini (1788–1863), Italian sculptor

Middle name
 Luc Adamo Matéta (born 1949), Congolese politician
 Paula Adamo DeSutter, United States Assistant Secretary of State for Verification, Compliance, and Implementation (2002-2009)

Surname 
 Amelia Adamo (born 1947), Swedish editor-in-chief
 Andrea Adamo (born 1991), Italian footballer
 Andrea Adamo (racing manager) (born 1971), Italian engineer and racing manager
 Antonio Adamo (born 1957), Italian pornographic film director
 Christine Adamo (born 1965), French writer
 Délizia Adamo (born 1952), Italian / Belgian singer known by the mononym Délizia
 Donna Adamo (born 1970), American retired professional wrestling valet and professional wrestler, better known by her ring name Elektra
 Emma Adamo (born c. 1963), British businesswoman
 Frank Adamo (1893–1988), American doctor honored for his medical service during World War II
 Giulia Adamo (born 1949), Italian politician
 Mark Adamo (born 1962), American composer, librettist and professor of music composition
 Matteo Marchisano-Adamo (born 1973), American sound designer, film editor, composer
 Momo Adamo (1895–1956), Italian American mobster in the American Mafia
 Nicola Adamo (born 1959), Italian politician
 Peter D'Adamo, naturopathic physician and advocate of the Blood type diet
 Salvatore Adamo (born 1943), Italian / Belgian composer and singer also known as Adamo

References 

Masculine given names
Italian-language surnames
Italian masculine given names